The Grammy Award for Best Traditional Blues Album was awarded from 1983 to 2011 and from 2017 onwards. Until 1992 the award was known as Best Traditional Blues Performance and was twice awarded to individual tracks rather than albums.

The award was discontinued after the 2011 Grammy season in a major overhaul of Grammy categories. From 2012 onwards, the category was merged with the Best Contemporary Blues Album category to form the new Best Blues Album category. However, in 2016 the Grammy organisation decided to revert the situation back to the pre-2012 era, with two separate categories for traditional and contemporary blues recordings respectively.

Years reflect the year in which the Grammy Awards were handed out, for music released in the previous year. B.B. King holds the record of most wins in the category with ten.

Recipients

References

Sources
Grammy Awards – Past Winners SearchAs noted in this article: search years are offset by one year.

 
Traditional Blues Album
Blues music awards
Album awards